Liz is a feminine nickname or given name. It may also refer to:

 Liż, a village in Poland
 Liz (surname)
 Liz (musician), American singer
 Liz: The Elizabeth Taylor Story, a 1995 biographical television film